Abdu'l-Aziz Khan may refer to:

 Abdu'l-Aziz (1614–1683), ruler of the Khanate of Bukhara
 Abdulaziz (1830–1876), Ottoman sultan
 Abdul Aziz Khan (cricketer) (fl. 1912–1926)
 Abdul Aziz Khan was the Mughal governor of Shivner.